Sparganothoides torusana is a species of moth of the family Tortricidae. It is found in Mexico (Veracruz) and Costa Rica.

The length of the forewings is 6.1–7 mm for males and 6.8–7.4 mm for females. The ground colour of the forewings is brownish yellow to golden yellow, with scattered orange and brown scaling. The hindwings are brownish yellow near the base, becoming yellowish grey or grey toward the margins. Adults have been recorded on wing in July and October in Mexico and in October, December and March in Costa Rica.

Etymology
The species name refers to the protuberances of the head and is derived from Latin torus (meaning a round swelling).

References

Moths described in 2009
Sparganothoides